Edward D. Powell (July 12, 1910 – November 1986), nicknamed "Big Red", was an American Negro league catcher in the 1930s.

A native of Livingston, Alabama, Powell made his Negro leagues debut in 1936 for the New York Cubans. The following season, he played for the New York Black Yankees, and finished his career in 1938 with the Washington Black Senators. Powell died in New York, New York, in 1986 at age 76.

References

External links
 and Seamheads

1910 births
1986 deaths
Date of death missing
New York Black Yankees players
New York Cubans players
Washington Black Senators players
20th-century African-American sportspeople
Baseball catchers